Miguel Muñoz (died 1553) was a Roman Catholic prelate who served as Bishop of Cuenca (1547–1553) and Bishop of Tui (1540–1547).

Biography
On 28 January 1540, Miguel Muñoz was appointed during the papacy of Pope Paul III as Bishop of Tui.
On 12 April 1547, he was appointed during the papacy of Pope Paul III as Bishop of Cuenca.
He served as Bishop of Cuenca until his death on 13 September 1553.

References

External links and additional sources
 (for Chronology of Bishops) 
 (for Chronology of Bishops) 
 (for Chronology of Bishops) 
 (for Chronology of Bishops) 

16th-century Roman Catholic bishops in Spain
Bishops appointed by Pope Paul III
1553 deaths